One Man, One Matchet is a novel written by Nigerian author T. M. Aluko and published in 1964 as the 11th book in the Heinemann African Writers Series. The novel tells the story of a community in Western Nigeria during the end of the colonial period and beginning of independence. Set in a small community where the majority of the inhabitants are dependent on the revenue from their cocoa crops, the story looks at the role of the semi-literate Benjamin Benjamin in the small community.

References

External links
Oriyomi Adebare's 2013 review of One Man, One Matchet (by T. M. Aluko) for AfricaBookClub

British Empire in fiction
Novels set in colonial Africa
Historical novels
Nigerian English-language novels
Novels set in Nigeria
1964 Nigerian novels
Heinemann (publisher) books
Postcolonial novels
African Writers Series